Off World One is an album by American composer Bill Laswell, issued under the moniker Possession. It was released on January 30, 1996, by Sub Meta.

Track listing

Personnel 
Adapted from the Off World One liner notes.

Musicians
Aïyb Dieng – percussion
Fousseny Kouyate – kora
Bill Laswell – bass guitar, drum programming, effects, musical arrangements, producer
Foday Musa Suso – balafon

Technical
Dave McKean – cover art
Robert Musso – engineering
Aldo Sampieri – design

Release history

References

External links 
 
 Off World One at Bandcamp

1996 albums
Bill Laswell albums
Albums produced by Bill Laswell
Albums with cover art by Dave McKean